Dick Peth is the head coach for the Wartburg Knights men's basketball program, in his 26th season at Wartburg and 38th year as a college head basketball coach. He is an alumnus of the University of Iowa, 1979.

Playing career
Dick Peth played high school basketball at Tomah High School in Tomah, Wisconsin.  In high school he was a 3 time first-team all-conference player and finished his career with 1,331 points which ranks second on the LaCrosse Tribune's all-time boys' basketball list.  In 2013 Peth was inducted into the Wisconsin basketball hall of fame. After high school he went on to play basketball at the University of Iowa from 1975 to 1979 for legendary Iowa head coach Lute Olson.  Peth was a 4-year member of the basketball program.  During his senior season he was named team co-captain and started for the Big Ten champion 1978–79 Iowa team.  To date this is the last regular season championship Iowa has won.

Coaching career

Denver University
Peth began his coaching career in 1980 as an assistant for Denver University.  He was elevated to head coach in April 1985 following the death of then head coach Floyd Theard, who passed away from a heart attack following the 1985 season.  Peth went on to coach for the Denver for 12 seasons.  During his tenure he lead them to 221 wins and 3 NCAA tournament appearances.  He was inducted into Denver University's athletic hall of fame in 2020 and is still the winningest coach in the program history.

Wartburg College
Dick Peth took over the Wartburg men's basketball program in 1997.  During his current tenure at Wartburg he has lead them to 3 regular season  Iowa Intercollegiate Athletic Conference championships, including back to back in 2005 and 2006.  In 2017 his Wartburg Knight basketball team shocked the conference by winning the IIAC tournament as the tournament's 6th seed. They would go on the reach the NCAA Sweet Sixteen, upsetting #10 Benedictine College and #4 UW-River Falls in the first and second rounds.  In December 2021 Peth entered the 600 win club following Wartburg's 82–70 win against University of Wisconsin–Eau Claire.

Head coaching record

References

External links 
 Dick Peth Coaching profile
 Denver Basketball History

Living people
American men's basketball coaches
Basketball coaches from Wisconsin
Basketball players from Wisconsin
Wartburg Knights men's basketball coaches
Denver Pioneers men's basketball coaches
Iowa Hawkeyes men's basketball players
People from Tomah, Wisconsin
Year of birth missing (living people)